McDade is an unincorporated community and census-designated place in northern Bastrop County, Texas, located along U.S. Route 290. As of the 2020 census, it had a population of 720.

Census Designated Place history
This was a new CDP for the 2010 census.

The community is named for James W. McDade, a major stockholder in the Houston and Texas Central Railroad in 1869.

The McDade Independent School District serves area students.

McDade was, for several years, the childhood home of 1950s television and recording star Gale Storm, as her mother owned a millinery shop in McDade.

Geography

Demographics 

As of the 2020 United States census, there were 720 people, 368 households, and 268 families residing in the CDP.

References

External links
 

Census-designated places in Bastrop County, Texas
Census-designated places in Texas
Census-designated places in Greater Austin
Unincorporated communities in Texas